JPR may stand for:
 J. P. R. Williams (born 1949), Welsh rugby player
 Institute for Jewish Policy Research, a British think tank
 Jefferson Public Radio, headquartered in Ashland, Oregon
 Jeppiaar (1931–2016), Indian educationalist
 Ji-Paraná Airport, in Brazil
 Journal of Peace Research
 Journal of Plant Research
 Journal of Proteome Research
 Journal of Psychosomatic Research
 Judeo-Persian, a language of Iran